Jovan "Jovo" Stanojević (Cyrillic: Јово Станојевић; born 27 September 1977) is a Serbian former professional basketball player.

Professional career
Stanojević began his professional career at the age of 16, playing with Vojvodina in the Yugoslav Basketball League. As one of the most promising players of his generation, Stanojević participated twice at the Nike Hoop Summit in 1995 and 1996.

Throughout his career, Stanojević played abroad in several countries, including five seasons in Germany with Alba Berlin, from 2002 to 2007. He also spent few years in Turkey, playing with Beşiktaş Cola Turka, Kepez Belediyesi, Pınar Karşıyaka and TED Ankara Kolejliler. In August 2013, he decided to retire.

In September 2019, Stanojević joined I Came to Play of the amateur fourth-tier Serbian League.

Yugoslav national team
Stanojević won a gold medal at the 2001 Summer Universiade in Beijing.

References

External links

 Jovo Stanojević at tblstat.net
 Jovo Stanojević at euroleague.net

1977 births
Living people
ABA League players
Alba Berlin players
BC Kyiv players
Beşiktaş men's basketball players
Centers (basketball)
Competitors at the 1997 Mediterranean Games
Israeli Basketball Premier League players
I Came to Play players
Karşıyaka basketball players
Kepez Belediyesi S.K. players
KK Crvena zvezda players
KK Mega Basket players
KK Partizan players
KK Vojvodina players
KK Vojvodina Srbijagas players
Maccabi Ra'anana players
Mediterranean Games bronze medalists for Yugoslavia
Serbian expatriate basketball people in Germany
Serbian expatriate basketball people in Israel
Serbian expatriate basketball people in Kuwait
Serbian expatriate basketball people in Poland
Serbian expatriate basketball people in Turkey
Serbian expatriate basketball people in Ukraine
Serbian men's basketball players
Sportspeople from Sombor
TED Ankara Kolejliler players
Asseco Gdynia players
Mediterranean Games medalists in basketball
Universiade medalists in basketball
Universiade gold medalists for Serbia and Montenegro
Medalists at the 2001 Summer Universiade